Arnobia is a genus of Asian bush crickets of the tribe Holochlorini within the subfamily Phaneropterinae.

Species
The Orthoptera Species File lists the following species recorded from Indo-China, eastern China (including Taiwan), Japan and Malesia:
 Arnobia guangxiensis Liu, 2011
 Arnobia hainanensis Liu, 2011
 Arnobia inocellata Gorochov, 1998
 Arnobia ocellata (Ingrisch, 1994)
 Arnobia pilipes Haan, 1842 - type species (as Locusta pilipes Haan = A. pilipes pilipes)
 Arnobia tinae Tan & Artchawakom, 2014
 Arnobia trichopus Haan, 1842
 Arnobia vietensis Gorochov, 1998

References

Tettigoniidae genera
Phaneropterinae
Orthoptera of Asia